Darren Edward James Pitcher (12 October 1969 – 25 November 2018) was an English professional footballer who played as a defender and a midfielder.

He notably played in the Premier League for Crystal Palace during the 1994–95 and 1997–98 seasons, he also played in the Football League for both Charlton Athletic and Leyton Orient as well as a brief loan spell in Ireland with Galway United. He retired from professional football due to injury but later spent time in Non-League football and turned out for Romford, Purfleet, Carshalton Athletic, Chelmsford City and Ilford.

Playing career
He played for Charlton Athletic, Crystal Palace and Leyton Orient. Pitcher started his career as a right full back at Charlton, but then converted to an effective defensive midfielder.

He signed on loan for Seamus McDonagh at Galway United in January 1989 and made his League of Ireland debut at Athlone on the 16th. When Frank Worthington made his debut on 12 February Pitcher scored the equaliser at St Patrick's Athletic.

Pitcher joined Crystal Palace in 1994. In his first season at the club he helped Palace to the semi finals of both domestic cups. It was in these cup runs that he scored his only two goals for Palace. In the League Cup quarter final against Manchester City he scored his first goal, and his second came in an FA Cup quarter final replay against Wolverhampton Wanderers. However Palace's runs were ended by Liverpool in the League Cup semi final and Manchester United in the FA Cup semi final. His career was ended at Crystal Palace in a match against Huddersfield Town in August 1996, after a challenge by Paul Reid. He attempted to bring a case of negligence against Huddersfield Town, which he lost. He never played for Palace again, and never played professional football again except for a brief loan spell at Leyton Orient in January 1998. Pitcher later played in Non-League football, for Romford, Purfleet, Carshalton Athletic, Chelmsford City and Ilford.

Personal life
After retiring from football, Pitcher worked in the building trade.

Death
On 26 November 2018, it was announced that Pitcher had died.

References

External links

1969 births
2018 deaths
English footballers
Charlton Athletic F.C. players
Crystal Palace F.C. players
Leyton Orient F.C. players
Romford F.C. players
Thurrock F.C. players
Carshalton Athletic F.C. players
Chelmsford City F.C. players
Ilford F.C. players
Premier League players
Footballers from Stepney
English Football League players
Galway United F.C. (1937–2011) players
League of Ireland players
Association football defenders